The 1949–50 season was the 51st completed season of The Football League.

Final league tables

The tables below are reproduced here in the exact form that they can be found at The Rec.Sport.Soccer Statistics Foundation website and in Rothmans Book of Football League Records 1888–89 to 1978–79, with home and away statistics separated.

Beginning with the season 1894–95, clubs finishing level on points were separated according to goal average (goals scored divided by goals conceded), or more properly put, goal ratio. In case one or more teams had the same goal difference, this system favoured those teams who had scored fewer goals. The goal average system was eventually scrapped beginning with the 1976–77 season.

From the 1922–23 season, the bottom two teams of both Third Division North and Third Division South were required to apply for re-election.

First Division

Portsmouth retained the First Division title, finishing level on points with Wolverhampton Wanderers. Sunderland finished a single point behind the leading pair, with Manchester United and Newcastle United completing the top five. Sixth placed Arsenal, the 1948 champions, finished four points off the top of the table but beat Liverpool to win their first postwar FA Cup.

Manchester City and Birmingham City went down to the Second Division.

Results

Maps

Second Division

Results

Maps

Third Division North

Results

Maps

Third Division South

Results

Maps

See also
1949-50 in English football
1949 in association football
1950 in association football

References
Ian Laschke: Rothmans Book of Football League Records 1888–89 to 1978–79. Macdonald and Jane’s, London & Sydney, 1980.

English Football League seasons
Eng
1